Qianzhou may refer to:

Qianzhou (in modern Jiangxi) (虔州)
Qianzhou (in modern Chongqing and Guizhou) (黔州)
Qianzhou (in modern Liaoning) (黔州)

Chinese subdistricts 
 Qianzhou Subdistrict, Wuxi (前洲街道), a subdistrict of Huishan District (惠山区), Wuxi City, Jiangsu Province.
 Qianzhou, Jishou (乾州街道), a subdistrict of Jishou City, Hunan Province.